Goalball at the 1976 Summer Paralympics consisted of a men's team event.

Medal summary

Competition

Results

References 

 

1976 Summer Paralympics events
1976
1976 in sports
Goalball in Canada